Bilaval or Bilawal is a raga and the basis for the eponymous thaat (musical mode) in Hindustani classical music. Raga Bilaval is named after Veraval, Gujarat.

Bilaval has been the standard for North Indian music since the early 19th century. Its tonal relationships are comparable to the Western music C major scale. Bilaval appears in the Ragamala as a ragini of Bhairav but today it is the head of the Bilaval thaat. The Ragamala names Bilaval as a Putra (son) of Bhairav but no relationship between these two ragas are made today. Bilaval is a morning raga that is intended to be sung with a feeling of deep devotion and repose and is often performed during the hot months. The Bilaval is equivalent to the Carnatic raga melakarta, Sankarabharanam, as well as the Western Ionian mode (major scale), and contains the notes S R G M P D N S'. The pitches of Bilaval thaat are all  (natural). Flat or sharp pitches always occur regarding the interval pattern in Bilaval thaat.

Bilaval raga is in the Sikh tradition of northern India and is part of the Sikh holy scripture Granth, the Sri Guru Granth Sahib. Every raga has a set of strict rules that govern the number of notes that can be used, which notes can be used, and their interplay that must be adhered to for the composition of a tune. Bilaval is the thirty-fourth raga to appear in the series of sixty compositions in the Sri Guru Granth Sahib. The composition in this raga appears on 64 pages from page numbers 795 to 859.

The Indian National Anthem Jana Gana Mana is sung in the raga Gaud Sarang. It is believed that the National Anthem of India is sung in raga Alhaiya Bilaval but this is not the case. There is a svara that changes the raga of Jana Gana Mana. In the national anthem, the  Madhyam svara is used. Raga Alhaiya Bilaval does not employ the  Madhyama svara; raga Alhaiya Bilaval is the raga of all  Svaras and no other types of svaras. Raga Gaud Sarang has the  Madhyama svara.

Aroha and avaroha
Arohana/Arohi: Sa, Re, Ga, ma, Pa, Dha, Ni, Sa'

Avrohana/Avarahi: Sa' Ni Dha, Pa, ma Ga, Ma, Re Sa

Vadi and samavadi
Vadi: Dha

Samavadi: Ga

Pakad or chalan
Ga Re, Ga Ma Dha Pa, Ma Ga, Ma Re Sa
Ga Pa Ni Dha Ni Sa
Ga Re Ga Pa, Ni Dha Ni Sa
Sa Ni Dha Pa Ga Ma Re Sa

Samay (time)
Morning: First pahar of the day (4-7 AM)

Film songs in Tamil

Notes

References
 Bor, Joep (ed). Rao, Suvarnalata; der Meer, Wim van; Harvey, Jane (co-authors) The Raga Guide: A Survey of 74 Hindustani Ragas. Zenith Media, London: 1999.

External links
SRA on Samay and Ragas
SRA on Ragas and Thaats

Gujarati music
Hindustani ragas
Ragas in the Guru Granth Sahib